Aqil Al-Turaihi or Aqeel al-Turaihi is an Iraqi politician who has been the Governor of Karbala since 2016.

References

Governors of Karbala Governorate
Iraqi Muslims
Living people
Year of birth missing (living people)